Petkage is a South Korean travel variety show starring Kim Tae-yeon, Kim Hee-chul, Hong Hyun-hee, and Kang Ki-young. The teaser video was released on August 14, 2021. The show premiered on JTBC on August 26, 2021, and aired every Thursday at 22:30 (KST) for episode 1 to 6, and airs every Monday at 11:00 KST for episode 7 and 8.

Synopsis
Petkage is a travel show in which the cast members and their dogs travel to various locations in South Korea. The cast members are free to choose their own destination, transportation, and itinerary.

Cast
Main
 Kim Tae-yeon
 Kim Hee-chul
 Hong Hyun-hee
 Kang Ki-young

Guest
 Yoon Eun-hye (Ep. 2–4)
 Hong Seok-cheon (Ep. 4)
 Choi Yeo-jin (Ep. 5–6)
 Park Sung-kwang (Ep. 5–6)
 Lee Tae-sun (Ep. 5)
 Jun Jin (Ep. 7–8)
 Kim Jae-kyung (Ep. 7–8)

Ratings

References

External links
  

Korean-language television shows
South Korean variety television shows
South Korean travel television series
2020s South Korean television series
2021 South Korean television series debuts
JTBC original programming